Vanessa María Cárdenas Bravo (born May 4, 1981) is a Venezuelan beauty pageant titleholder who was the official representative of Venezuela at the Miss World 2000 pageant in London, United Kingdom on November 30, 2000. She was born in Maracaibo, Venezuela, the daughter of Chilean Sonia Bravo, a delegate of the 1968 Miss Chile pageant, who won the title of Miss Objetivo International 1968 in Sao Paulo, Brazil.

References

External links
Miss Venezuela Official Website
Miss World Official Website

Miss Venezuela World winners
Miss World 2000 delegates
People from Maracaibo
1981 births
Living people